is a Japanese Olympic dressage rider. Representing Japan, he competed at the 2016 Summer Olympics in Rio de Janeiro where he finished 58th in the individual and 11th in the team competitions.

Takahashi also competed at the 2006 Asian Games, where he won a bronze medal in team dressage.

References

External links
 

Living people
1982 births
Japanese male equestrians
Equestrians at the 2016 Summer Olympics
Olympic equestrians of Japan
Equestrians at the 2006 Asian Games
Equestrians at the 2018 Asian Games
Asian Games gold medalists for Japan
Asian Games bronze medalists for Japan
Asian Games medalists in equestrian
Medalists at the 2006 Asian Games
Medalists at the 2018 Asian Games
Japanese dressage riders